Un Chien Andalou (An Andalusian Dog) is a 1929 French silent short film directed by Luis Buñuel, and written by Buñuel and Salvador Dalí. Buñuel's first film, it was initially released in a limited capacity at Studio des Ursulines in Paris, but became popular and ran for eight months.

Un Chien Andalou has no plot in the conventional sense of the word. With disjointed chronology, jumping from the initial "once upon a time" to "eight years later" without events or characters changing, it uses dream logic in narrative flow that can be described in terms of the then-popular Freudian free association, presenting a series of tenuously related scenes. Un Chien Andalou  is a seminal work in the genre of surrealist cinema.

Synopsis
The film opens with a title card reading "Once upon a time". A man (Luis Buñuel) sharpens his razor at his balcony door and tests the razor on his thumb. He then opens the door, and idly fingers the razor while gazing at the moon, about to be bisected by a thin cloud, from his balcony. There is a cut to a close-up of a young woman (Simone Mareuil) being held by the man. She calmly stares straight ahead as he brings the razor near her eye. Another cut occurs to the cloud passing in front of the moon, then a cut to a close up of a hand slitting the eye of an animal with the razor (which happens so quickly the viewer may believe it was the woman's eye), and the vitreous humour spills out from it.

The subsequent title card reads "eight years later". A slim young man (Pierre Batcheff) bicycles down a calm urban street wearing what appears to be a nun's habit and a striped box with a strap around his neck. A cut occurs to the young woman from the first scene, who has been reading in a sparsely furnished upstairs apartment. She hears the young man approaching on his bicycle and casts aside the book she was reading (revealing a reproduction of Vermeer's The Lacemaker). She goes to the window and sees the young man lying on the curb, his bicycle on the ground. She emerges from the building and attempts to revive the young man.

Later, the young woman assembles pieces of the young man's clothing on a bed in the upstairs room, and concentrates upon the clothing. The young man appears near the door. The young man and the young woman stare at his hand, which has a hole in the palm from which ants emerge. A slow transition occurs focusing on the armpit hair of the young woman as she lies on the beach and a sea urchin at a sandy location. There is a cut to an androgynous young woman, with bobbed hair and dressed in rather masculine attire, in the street below the apartment.  She pokes at a severed human hand with her cane while surrounded by a large crowd held back by policemen.

The crowd clears when the policeman places the hand in the box previously carried by the young man and gives it to the young woman. The androgynous young woman contemplates something happily while standing in the middle of the now busy street clutching the box. She is then run over by a car and a few bystanders gather around her. The young man and the young woman watch these events unfold from the apartment window. The young man seems to take sadistic pleasure in the androgynous young woman's danger and subsequent death, and as he gestures at the shocked young woman in the room with him, he leers at her and gropes her breasts.

The young woman resists him at first, but then allows him to molest her as he imagines her nude from the front and the rear. The young woman pushes him away as he drifts off and she attempts to escape by running to the other side of the room. The young man corners her as she reaches for a racquet in self-defense, but he suddenly picks up two ropes and drags two grand pianos containing dead and rotting donkeys, stone tablets containing the Ten Commandments, two pumpkins, and two rather bewildered priests (played by Jaime Miravilles and Salvador Dalí) who are attached by the ropes. As he is unable to pursue, the young woman escapes the room. The young man chases after her, but she traps his hand, which is infested with ants, in the door. She finds the young man in the next room, dressed in his nun's garb in the bed.

The subsequent title card reads "around three in the morning". The young man is roused from his rest by the sound of a door-buzzer ringing (represented visually by a Martini shaker being shaken by a set of arms through two holes in a wall). The young woman goes to answer the door and does not return. Another young man, whom we see only from behind, dressed in lighter clothing, arrives in the apartment, gesturing angrily at him. The second young man forces the first one to throw away his nun's clothing and then makes him stand with his face to the wall, as if in disgrace.

The subsequent title card reads "Sixteen years ago".  We see the second young man's face for the first time (and discover that he is also played by Pierre Batcheff) as he admires the art supplies and books on the table near the wall and forces the first young man to hold two of the books as he stares at the wall. The first young man eventually shoots the second young man when the books abruptly turn into revolvers. The second young man, now in a meadow, dies while swiping at the back of a nude female figure which suddenly disappears into thin air. A group of men come and carry his corpse away.

The young woman returns to the apartment and sees a death's-head moth. The first young man sneers at her as she retreats and wipes his mouth off his face with his hand. The young woman very nervously applies some lipstick in response. Subsequently, the first young man makes the young woman's armpit hair attach itself to where his mouth would be on his face through gestures. The young woman looks at the first young man with disgust, and leaves the apartment sticking her tongue out at him.

As she exits her apartment, the street is replaced by a coastal beach, where the young woman meets a third man with whom she walks arm in arm. He shows her the time on his watch and they walk near the rocks, where they find the remnants of the first young man's nun's clothing and the box. They seem to walk away clutching each other happily and make romantic gestures in a long tracking shot. However, the film abruptly cuts to the final shot with a title card reading "In Spring", showing the couple buried in beach sand up to their elbows, motionless and perhaps dead.

Cast
 Simone Mareuil as Young Girl (as Simonne Mareuil)
 Pierre Batcheff as Young Man and Second Young Man (as Pierre Batchef)
 Luis Buñuel as Man in Prologue (uncredited)
 Salvador Dalí as Seminarist and as Man on Beach (uncredited)
 Robert Hommet as Third Young Man (uncredited)
 Kieran Agterberg as Seminarist (uncredited)
 Fano Messan as Androgynous Young Woman (uncredited)
 Jaime Miravilles as Fat seminarist (uncredited)

Production

Development

The screenplay of the film is based on two dreams of its creators Luis Buñuel and Salvador Dali. The idea for the film began when Buñuel was working as an assistant director for Jean Epstein in France. Buñuel told Dalí at a restaurant one day about a dream in which a cloud sliced the moon in half "like a razor blade slicing through an eye". Dalí responded that he had dreamed about a hand crawling with ants.  Excitedly, Buñuel declared:  "There's the film, let's go and make it." They were fascinated by what the psyche could create, and decided to write a script based on the concept of suppressed human emotions. The title of the film is a hidden reminiscence from the Spanish saying: "the Andalusian dog howls –someone has died!” The screenplay was written in a few days.

According to Buñuel, they adhered to a simple rule: “Do not dwell on what required purely rational, psychological or cultural explanations. Open the way to the irrational. It was accepted only that which struck us, regardless of the meaning ... We did not have a single argument. A week of impeccable understanding. One, say, said: "A man drags double bass." “No,” the other objected. And the objection was immediately accepted as completely justified. But when the proposal of one liked the other, it seemed to us magnificent, indisputable and immediately introduced into the script.”

In deliberate contrast to the approach taken by Jean Epstein and his peers, which was to never leave anything in their work to chance, with every aesthetic decision having a rational explanation and fitting clearly into the whole,  Buñuel made clear throughout his writings that, between Dalí and himself, the only rule for the writing of the script was: "No idea or image that might lend itself to a rational explanation of any kind would be accepted." He also stated: "Nothing, in the film, symbolizes anything. The only method of investigation of the symbols would be, perhaps, psychoanalysis."

In his 1939 autobiography Buñuel said: "In the film the aesthetics of Surrealism are combined to some of Freud's discoveries. The film was totally in keeping with the basic principle of the school, which defined Surrealism as 'Psychic Automatism', unconscious, capable of returning to the mind its true functions, beyond any form of control by reason, morality or aesthetics."

Filming
The film was financed by Buñuel's mother, and shot in Le Havre and Paris at the Billancourt Studios over a period of 10 days in March 1928.  It is a black and white, 35 mm, silent film, with a running time of 17 minutes, although some sources state 24 minutes, and a physical length of 430 meters.

For many years (and still), published and unpublished reports have circulated that Buñuel had used a dead goat's eye, or that of a dead sheep, or of a dead donkey, or other animal, in the notorious eyeball-slicing scene. However, in an interview in 1975 or '76, Buñuel claimed that he had used a dead calf's eye. Through the use of intense lighting, and bleaching of the calf's skin, Buñuel attempted to make the furred face of the animal appear as human skin.

During the bicycle scene, the woman who is sitting on a chair, reading, throws the book aside when she notices the man who has fallen. The image it shows when it lies open is a reproduction of a painting by Vermeer, whom Dalí greatly admired and often referred to in his own paintings.

In Buñuel's original script, the final shot was to feature the corpses of the man and woman "consumed by swarms of flies". However, this special effect was modified due to budget limitations, with the film ending with a still shot of the man and woman, who had been walking in the previous beach scene, half-buried in the sand and apparently dead.

The movie contains several thematic references to Federico García Lorca and other writers of that time.  For example, the rotting donkeys are a reference to the popular children's novel Platero y yo by Juan Ramón Jiménez, which Buñuel and Dalí hated.

Anthropologist Jean Rouch has reported that after filming was complete, Buñuel and Dalí had run out of money, forcing Buñuel to edit the film personally in his kitchen without the aid of a Moviola or any other technical equipment.

Reception
The first screening of Un Chien Andalou took place at Studio des Ursulines, with an audience of le tout-Paris. Notable attendees of the première included Pablo Picasso, Le Corbusier, Jean Cocteau, Christian Bérard and Georges Auric, in addition to the entirety of André Breton's Surrealist group. The audience's positive reception of the film amazed Buñuel, who was relieved that no violence ensued. Dalí, on the contrary, was reportedly disappointed, feeling the audience's reaction made the evening "less exciting". Buñuel since claimed that prior to the show, he had put stones in his pockets "to throw at the audience in case of disaster", although others had no recollection of this.

It was Buñuel's intention to shock and insult the intellectual bourgeoisie of his youth, later saying:  "Historically, this film represents a violent reaction against what at that time was called 'avantgarde cine,' which was directed exclusively to the artistic sensibility and to the reason of the spectator."  Against his hopes and expectations, the film was a huge success amongst the French bourgeoisie, leading Buñuel to exclaim in exasperation, "What can I do about the people who adore all that is new, even when it goes against their deepest convictions, or about the insincere, corrupt press, and the inane herd that saw beauty or poetry in something which was basically no more than a desperate impassioned call for murder?"

After its "triumphant premiere", Un Chien Andalou was bought by the owner of "Studio-28". During its eight-month run, forty or fifty informers came to the police with a demand to ban such an indecent and cruel film. This was the beginning of years of insults and threats that haunted Buñuel until his old age. A likely apocryphal account claimed that two miscarriages occurred while watching the film. Despite the criticism, however, the film was never banned.

Through their accomplishment with Un Chien Andalou, Dalí and Buñuel became the first filmmakers to be officially welcomed into the ranks of the Surrealists by the movement's leader André Breton, an event recalled by film historian Georges Sadoul: "Breton had convoked the creators to our usual venue [the Café Radio] ... one summer's evening. Dalí had the large eyes, grace, and timidity of a gazelle. To us, Buñuel, big and athletic, his black eyes protruding a little, seemed exactly like he always is in Un Chien Andalou, meticulously honing the razor that will slice the open eye in two."

The Japanese filmmaker Akira Kurosawa cited Un Chien Andalou as one of his favorite films.

Sequel

Among the most enthusiastic viewers of the film were the wealthy couple Viscount Charles and Marie-Laure de Noailles, who commissioned Dalí and Buñuel to create a sequel, of around the same length, with sound, to be called La Bête Andalouse, in order to affirm its connection with Un Chien.  Dalí stated that the theme of the new film was to parallel that of the first:  "to present the straight and pure 'conduct' of someone who continues to pursue love despite wretched humanitarian ideals, patriotism and the other poor mechanisms of reality."  This new film ultimately was released in 1930 under the title L'Age d'Or.

The sequel was not a success with Parisian high society. First shown in November 1930, it was received extremely coldly. The next day, Charles de Noaille learned that he had been expelled  from the Jockey Club de Paris. The Noaille family quickly withdrew the film after it was banned by the Prefecture of Police of Paris.

Soundtrack
During the original 1929 screening in Paris, Buñuel selected music which he played live on a gramophone. Modern prints of the film feature a soundtrack consisting of excerpts from Richard Wagner's "Liebestod" from his opera Tristan und Isolde and a recording of two Argentinian tangos, "Tango Argentino" and "Recuerdos" by the Vicente Alvarez & Carlos Otero et son orchestre. They were first added to a print of the film in 1960 under Buñuel's supervision.

Influence
Film scholar Ken Dancyger has argued that Un Chien Andalou might be the genesis of the filmmaking style present in the modern music video. Roger Ebert had called it the inspiration for low budget independent films. Premiere ranked the opening scene as 10th out of "The 25 Most Shocking Moments in Movie History".

The film was shown before every concert of the Isolar Tour by British artist David Bowie.

The lyrics of the Pixies song "Debaser" are based on Un Chien Andalou.

See also
 List of films with a 100% rating on Rotten Tomatoes, a film review aggregator website

References

Further reading
 
«Film, Freud and Paranoia: Dalí and the Representation of Male Desire in An Andalusian Dog.» Diacritics

External links
 Un perro andaluz. The film, online at RTVE.
 
 
 
 Un Chien Andalou analyzed by Michael Koller
Un Chien Andalou, from Shatter, Rupture, Break one of the Art Institute of Chicago's digital scholarly catalogues 

1929 films
1929 short films
Surrealist films
Film with screenplays by Salvador Dalí
Films directed by Luis Buñuel
French black-and-white films
French silent short films
1920s avant-garde and experimental films
Censored films
Film controversies in France
1929 directorial debut films